Rusconi is an Italian surname, most common in northern Italy and Switzerland. Notable people with the surname include:
 Antonio Lamberto Rusconi (1743-1825), Italian Roman Catholic cardinal
Benedetto Rusconi (c. 1460–1525), Italian painter
Camillo Rusconi (1658–1728), Italian sculptor 
Frank Rusconi (1874–1964), Australian quarry owner and monumental mason
Giovan Antonio Rusconi (c. 1500/1505-1578), Venetian architect
Giovanni Rusconi (d. 1412), Italian Roman Catholic bishop
Giulio Rusconi (1885-?), Italian fencer
Mauro Ruscóni (1776-1849), Italian physician and zoologist
Paul Rusconi (born 1965), American contemporary artist
Stefan Rusconi (born 1979), Swiss pianist and composer
Stefano Rusconi (born 1968), Italian basketball player 

Italian-language surnames